Aryna Sabalenka was the defending champion, but she qualified to compete at the WTA Finals instead.

Alison Riske won the title, defeating Jaqueline Cristian in the final, 2–6, 6–2, 7–5. Saving two championship points.

Seeds
The top four seeds received a bye into the second round.

Draw

Finals

Top half

Bottom half

Qualifying

Seeds

Qualifiers

Lucky loser

First qualifier

Second qualifier

Third qualifier

Fourth qualifier

References

External links 
 Main draw
 Qualifying draw
 Player list

2021 WTA Tour
2021 in Austrian tennis